Daniel Giles Gillespie Sells (born 20 September 1978) is an English singer-songwriter and guitarist, best known as being the lead vocalist and frontman for the rock group The Feeling.

Biography
Sells and his brother James were co-parented, being brought up dividing their time between their father's house and their mother's house after their parents split when he was three years old. His mother is disability rights campaigner Katherine Gillespie Sells, and his father is Keith Sells. He was also parented by his mother's former partner Dilis, whom he refers to as his other mother. Sells attended Osidge Primary School and The Ashmole School in London along with fellow students Amy Winehouse and Rachel Stevens (S Club 7).

In early 2007, Sells was seen in an advertising campaign for the Autograph range at Marks and Spencer. He says he took part partly because his grandmother liked M&S, and would like to see him advertising it.

In addition to his work with The Feeling, he co-wrote songs for Sophie Ellis-Bextor's third solo album, Trip the Light Fantastic. The two songs he co-wrote appear on the track-listing as, "Only One" and "Love Is Here". Both tracks also feature his vocals, and "Love Is Here" includes his bandmate Richard Jones, Sophie Ellis-Bextor's husband, on bass guitar. Ellis-Bextor features on The Feeling's album, Together We Were Made, in song "Leave me Out of It".

Sells co-wrote and co-performed (both with Ian Masterson) the theme tune to the 2008 BBC comedy drama series Beautiful People, an adaptation of the memoirs of Simon Doonan. In addition, Sells also contributed another original track, entitled "Beautiful People", as well as a 2006 cover version of Hall & Oates's "She's Gone" with his The Feeling bandmates. All three tracks appeared on the Beautiful People soundtrack album released in October 2008.

As well as his accomplishments within the music industry he has also branched out in recent years into various theatre projects.

In 2014, he began his collaboration with choreographer Javier de Frutos on a ballet piece entitled '3 With D' which featured The Royal Ballet's principal dancer Edward Watson (dancer) and premiered at The London Coliseum.

In 2017, Sells composed the music for the musical Everybody's Talking About Jamie. The show opened at The Crucible Theatre, Sheffield in February 2017 and transferred to the West End at the Apollo Theatre in November. The soundtrack was released as an album in the same year, and features vocals by Sophie Ellis-Bextor, Betty Boo, and Josie Walker.

Influences
Sells has stated that Karen Carpenter was "one of the greatest vocal technicians ever". He also cites Freddie Mercury and Neil Young as influences.

Personal life
Sells is gay, and won two Stonewall Awards for Entertainer of the Year in 2007 and Entertainer of the Decade in 2015. Sells featured on the cover of an issue of Attitude magazine in 2008, being the first cover shoot Sells had done and was later on the front cover again on the September 2008 issue, alongside Alan Carr, Markus Feehily of Westlife and Sir Ian McKellen. He also revealed that he had given input into a future issue of Gay Times and that his middle name is Giles. In 2012, Sells wrote about his coming-out experience.

In 2014 Sells criticised gay celebrities who were not publicly out, saying that "their refusal to open up about their personal lives" makes them 'part of the problem' of sexual inequality in society.

References

External links
 
 
 

1978 births
Living people
Singers from London
English male singer-songwriters
English rock guitarists
English male guitarists
English people of Scottish descent
English rock singers
English LGBT singers
English LGBT songwriters
People educated at the BRIT School
People from Bounds Green
English gay musicians
Gay singers
Gay songwriters
21st-century British guitarists
21st-century English male singers
20th-century English LGBT people
21st-century English LGBT people